Taylor Guitars is an American guitar manufacturer based in El Cajon, California, and is one of the largest manufacturers of acoustic guitars in the United States. They specialize in acoustic guitars and semi-hollow electric guitars. The company was founded in 1974 by Bob Taylor and Kurt Listug.

History 
In 1972, at age 18, Bob Taylor began working at American Dream, a guitar-making shop owned by Sam Radding, where Kurt Listug was already an employee. When Radding decided to sell the business in 1974, Taylor, Listug, and a third employee, Steve Schemmer, bought American Dream and renamed it the Westland Music Company.

Needing a more compact logo suitable for the guitars' headstock, the founders decided to change the name to Taylor as it sounded more American than Listug. Kurt Listug said, "Bob was the real guitar-maker." Listug became the partnership's businessman while Taylor handled design and production. In 1976, the company decided to sell their guitars through retailers. In 1981, facing financial difficulties, Taylor Guitars took out a bank loan to purchase equipment.

As of 2012 Taylor Guitars had more than 700 employees in two factories: one in El Cajon, California, and the other in nearby Tecate, Mexico, where the company makes their lower-priced models and guitar cases. In early 2011, the company opened a Taylor distribution warehouse in the Netherlands to serve the European market. In January 2014, the U.S. State Department honored Taylor Guitars with an Award for Corporate Excellence (ACE) citing Taylor's commitment to responsible practices in obtaining ebony for its instruments, which notably included purchasing their own sustainable ebony mill and increasing its usable timber from 10% to 100%.

As of January 1, 2021, the company became fully employee-owned. In May 2022, Andy Powers was named the new CEO, President, and Chief Guitar Designer of the company.

Innovations 
In 1995, Bob Taylor was interested in finding out if the perception of using exotic tonewoods in quality guitars was more important than luthier techniques and good design. To that end, he recovered some oak from shipping pallets found at the factory for a dreadnought guitar's back and sides and used a nondescript 2x4 for its top, dubbing the result the Pallet Guitar. Its neck was also made from oak recovered from the pallet, and the fretboard’s Formica-and-pearl inlay depicted a fork lift. In 2000, a limited edition of 25 Grand Auditorium-bodied Pallet Guitars were reproduced with aluminum inlay included to accentuate the original nail holes in the pallet wood. These have been sold to collectors, but the original Pallet Guitar remains on display at the Taylor Guitars factory in El Cajon, California.

In January 1999, Taylor began making guitars with a patented, bolt-on neck they called the NT (new technology) neck. It differs from other guitar necks by using one continuous piece of wood all the way to the 19th fret to support the fretboard. More common practice in guitar neck construction is to support the fretboard up to the fourteenth fret, and glue the unsupported portion to the soundboard. The NT neck fits into a pocket on the top of the guitar body, achieving the desired angle with small shims. Guitars sometimes require a neck angle realignment (neck reset). Taylor's system achieves this by changing the shims to adjust the neck angle. Prior to 1999, Taylor Guitars had a simpler bolt-on neck design. Those necks can also be adjusted without the more complex process of ungluing the neck joint.

Taylor uses their own pickup system, the "Expression System," which consists of a humbucking induction pickup mounted in the neck and a pair of dynamic soundboard transducers wired to an onboard preamplifier designed by Rupert Neve. The entry-level 100 and 200 series use an externally similar system known as ES-T, which uses a single under-saddle pickup and no soundboard transducers. The first-generation ES system was introduced in 2004.  It had two transducers: one mounted to the bridge, and one on the lower bout of the sound board, and a small single-coil neck pickup mounted in the neck joint, all wired to the onboard preamp, which had three knobs for volume, tone, and blend.  This early ES system was available on the higher-end 500 series and above as well as the 30th-anniversary limited-edition series starting in the fall of 2004.  It was a custom order for the 300 and 400 series, and could be retrofitted to some older Taylor guitars with the NT neck design.

Factory 
Taylor's 145,000 square foot manufacturing facility is about 20 miles east of downtown San Diego in El Cajon, California. A free, guided tour of the Taylor Guitars factory is open to the public at 1:00 p.m., Monday through Friday except some holidays. For those too far away to visit the factory, Premier Guitars published a four-part tour of the Taylor Factory, narrated by Bob Taylor in 2008.

Notable players 

 William Ackerman
 Axel Bauer
 Jade Bird
 Zac Brown
 Lindsey Buckingham
 Dave Carroll
 Steven Curtis Chapman
 Tom Fletcher
 Jon Foreman
 Russ Freeman
 Andy Gullahorn
 Michael Hedges
 Sam Hui
 Alan Jackson
 David Gilmour
 Graham Russell
 Jewel
 Emily King
 Leo Kottke
 Dave Matthews
 Travis Meeks 
 Jason Mraz
 Dolores O'Riordan
 John Petrucci
 Prince
 Gabriella Quevedo
 Steve Stevens
 Al Stewart
 George Strait
 Sam Beam
 Taylor Swift
 Snuffy Walden
 Billy Joe Walker

Further reading 
 Taylor Guitars 30 Years of a New American Classic, Michael John Simmons
 PPV Medien; Hardcover edition (January 10, 2005)  
Guitar Lessons: A Life's Journey Turning Passion into Business, Bob Taylor
  Wiley; Hardcover 1st edition (January 25, 2011)

References

External links

 

Guitar manufacturing companies of the United States
Electric bass guitars by manufacturer
Manufacturing companies based in California
Companies based in El Cajon, California
American companies established in 1974
Manufacturing companies established in 1974
1974 establishments in California
Privately held companies based in California
Employee-owned companies of the United States